Dunster railway station is near Dunster, Somerset, England and is on the  West Somerset Railway, a heritage railway.

History
The station was opened on 16 July 1874 by the Minehead Railway. The line was operated by the Bristol and Exeter Railway which was also amalgamated into the Great Western Railway (GWR) in 1876. The Minehead Railway was itself absorbed into the GWR in 1897. A small signal box stood at the  end of the platform, but was demolished in 1926 when this was extended.

The GWR was nationalised into British Railways in 1948 and from 1964, when goods traffic was withdrawn on 6 July, the line was run down until it was eventually closed on 4 January 1971.  The line was reopened as a heritage railway operated by the West Somerset Railway on 28 March 1976.  The signal box was moved to Minehead in 1977 but the goods yard is now home to the railway's civil engineering team.

Description

The station is located one mile from the village of Dunster, which contains many historic buildings.  The stone station building and platform is on the south side-west of the line, its imposing design reflects its former status as the station for distinguished visitors to Dunster Castle. It is a Grade II listed building.  A goods shed was provided on the opposite side of the line and is now used as a workshop for the civil engineering team.

The Railway Printing Company is based in the old parcels office within the main building.  From here they supply tickets printed on their old Edmondson railway ticket press to the WSR and many other heritage lines.

Services

References

External links

 West Somerset Railway - Dunster station
 Dunster Station

West Somerset Railway
Heritage railway stations in Somerset
Railway stations in Great Britain opened in 1874
Railway stations in Great Britain closed in 1971
Railway stations in Great Britain opened in 1976
Former Great Western Railway stations
Grade II listed buildings in West Somerset
Grade II listed railway stations